Aukra is municipality in Møre og Romsdal county, Norway. It is part of the region of Romsdalen. The administrative centre is the village of Falkhytta, which is part of the Aukrasanden urban area.

The municipality is made up of the island of Gossa as well as many small surrounding islands, plus a small area around the village of Hollingen across the Julsundet strait on the mainland Romsdal peninsula. Some of the main population centers include the villages of Hollingen, Aukrasanden, Varhaugvika, and Røssøyvågen. Nyhamna is a major industrial area in Aukra.

The  municipality is the 345th largest by area out of the 356 municipalities in Norway. Aukra is the 215th most populous municipality in Norway with a population of 3,518.

General information
The municipality of Akerø was established on 1 January 1838 (see formannskapsdistrikt law). In 1840, most of Akerø on the Romsdal peninsula was separated to form the municipality of Frænen. On 1 January 1867, the islands that are located to the west of Gossa (population: 601) were separated to become the new Sandøy Municipality. On 1 January 1924, the southern part of the municipality (Otrøya and several other islands) were separated to form the new municipality of Sør-Aukra, and the remainder of the municipality was renamed Nord-Aukra.

During the 1960s, there were many municipal mergers across Norway due to the work of the Schei Committee. On 1 January 1964, the Mordal area of Nord-Aukra (population: 77) was transferred to Molde Municipality. On 1 January 1965, Nord- was dropped from the name of the municipality, so it was then just called Aukra.

On 1 January 2020, the uninhabited islands of Lyngværet and the island of Orta (population: 11) were transferred from Sandøy Municipality to Aukra.

Name
The municipality (originally the parish) is named after the old Aukra farm, since the first Aukra Church was built there. The first element is akr which means "field" or "acre" and the last element is vin which means "meadow" or "pasture". Before 1918, the name was written Akerø or Agerø.

Coat of arms
The coat of arms was granted on 22 May 1987. The arms show two Bronze Age bracelets on a blue background. The bracelets are based on an archaeological finding in the area. The rings thus symbolize the long tradition of habitation in the area.

Churches
The Church of Norway has one parish within the municipality of Aukra. It is part of the Molde domprosti (arch-deanery) in the Diocese of Møre.

History
Aukra is the site of a shipwreck and rescue operation, when the cargo ship  on 4 April 1938. The monument of Rokta is situated on Rindarøy island with a view of Galleskjæra where the Rokta sank.

Government
All municipalities in Norway, including Aukra, are responsible for primary education (through 10th grade), outpatient health services, senior citizen services, unemployment and other social services, zoning, economic development, and municipal roads. The municipality is governed by a municipal council of elected representatives, which in turn elect a mayor.  The municipality falls under the Møre og Romsdal District Court and the Frostating Court of Appeal.

Municipal council
The municipal council of Aukra is made up of 21 representatives that are elected to four year terms. The party breakdown of the council is as follows:

Mayor
The mayors of Aukra (incomplete list):
2019–present: Odd Jørgen Nilssen (H)
2007-2019: Bernhard Riksfjord (Ap)
1999-2007: Aud Mork (KrF)

Economy
The Nyhamna industrial area on the northeastern part of the island of Gossa in Aukra is the location from where the Langeled pipeline, transporting natural gas from the enormous Ormen Lange gas field to the United Kingdom, came onstream in 2007.

Aukra Auto runs the bus service on the island of Gossa.

Notable people 
 Jonas Danilssønn Ramus (1649 in Aukra - 1718) a Norwegian priest, author and historian
 Anton Beinset (1894 in Aukra – 1963) a journalist, newspaper editor, short story writer, crime fiction writer and politician
 Iver Horrem (born 1977 in Aukra) a Norwegian professional beach volleyball player
 Emilie Nautnes (born 1999 in Aukra) footballer, plays for the Norway women's national football team

Gallery

References

External links
Municipal fact sheet from Statistics Norway 

 
Municipalities of Møre og Romsdal
1838 establishments in Norway